Yaakov Yitzchak Horowitz is an American rabbi and one of North America's foremost experts on kosher food production.

He is particularly associated with Manischewitz, the continent's largest producer of kosher food, where he held a key position for over two decades, before being fired in 2016 for questioning the company's adherence to kosher law. In addition to serving as chief supervising rabbi of the Manischewitz group of companies on behalf of the Orthodox Union, he has also served as the course director of the kosher workshop at Rutgers University.

Rabbi Horowitz is a fourth generation American Chasidic rabbi, a scion of the Bostoner Chasidic Dynasty and the founder of the American Jewish Legacy, a nonprofit research organization that promotes Jewish heritage in the United States. Rabbi Horowitz is also an educator, pulpit rabbi and lecturer on the American Jewish experience. He is a noted expert in Jewish law as regards the Kosher Code especially the production of Matzo for Passover.

Early life
Horowitz was born in 1956 to Chaim Avrohom Horowitz, the Bostoner Rebbe of New York and Ramat Bet Shemesh, and to Miriam, daughter of Rebbe Elazar Adler, the Zvhiler Rebbe of Los Angeles of the Zvhil dynasty.

Horowitz was raised by his maternal grandparents in Los Angeles.

Horowitz studied in a number of Talmudic seminaries including Beth Medrash Gevoha of Lakewood, New Jersey, and was ordained as a rabbi.

Career
Horowitz joined Dor Yesharim, the Committee for the Prevention of Jewish Genetic Diseases, in 1986 as Director of Development. His work included publicizing the important work of this organization.

Chasidic Center of Nassau County
In 1992, Horowitz founded the Bostoner Bais Medrash of Lawrence (Chasidic Center of Nassau County) well known for its innovative youth programs and community service projects.

Kashrut

The Orthodox Union
Beginning his rabbinical work in the field of kosher food supervision (Kashrus) in 1989, Rabbi Horowitz joined the Orthodox Union (OU), the largest kosher food supervisory organization in the world. As Rabbinic Coordinator, he supervised the kosher food programs of Nestle Beverage, Smuckers and a number of other nationally recognized manufacturers of kosher products. He was instrumental in the creation and implementation of the Ingredient Approval Registry, the system which currently maintains the kosher status of all ingredients found in over 8,000 OU supervised food facilities in 80 countries.

Specialist in Passover food supervision
Horowitz joined the Manischewitz Food Company in 1996, where he represented the OU as Company Rabbi and Director, Kosher Development Operations, Systems and Marketplace of the Manischewitz Companies.

However, in 2016 Horowitz was fired from his position at Manischewitz, which he subsequently sued for wrongful termination. He alleges that Manischewitz started loosening its strict guidelines for keeping food kosher in 2009, but the Union of Orthodox Jewish Congregations of America, routinely looked the other way, fearing replacement with a different, less strict, certification company. Both the Orthodox Union Kosher Division and Manischewitz refute the claims.

Horowitz is one of the world experts of Passover Matzo (and author of the OU manual on this subject) and kosher food, having assisted in Matzo and matzo flour production around in Israel, England, Mexico, Argentina and the former USSR.

American Jewish history
Horowitz founded the American Jewish Legacy (AJL) in 1998. The AJL is a national effort to preserve and document the unique, rich history of traditional Jewish congregations, individuals, rabbis and communities in the United States from Colonial times to the present. Working with noted academics, educational institutions, public and private archives, regional and national historic organizations across the country and abroad, the AJL has initiated projects and activities which seek to save this important historical resource and to gather archival information which is in imminent danger of being lost. The AJL also seeks to publicize the role Orthodox Jews played in the historical development of the American Jewish community.

The American Jewish Legacy's Exhibit, From the Mountains to the Prairie- 350 Years of Kosher & Jewish Life in America 1654-2004, was created in connection with the 350th anniversary celebration of Jewish settlement in America.

The AJL's current exhibition, From the Mountains to the Prairie: 350 Years of Kosher & Jewish Life in America 1654‐2004, is on national tour and has received academic and popular acclaim from the scholarly community, lay leaders, and the media – including the New York Times. The most recent venue was Columbus, Ohio in connection with Legacy 2010.

The AJL has also assumed responsibility for the reprint of several important works dealing with the history of the Orthodox Jewish community in the U.S.

In 2007 the Manischewitz Company commissioned the AJL to produce a series of American Jewish History panels which appeared on over one million Passover Matzo boxes. These panels publicized the commitment of the American Jewish community to the kosher laws and religious observance throughout its history.

In 2010 AJL created an American Jewish History Haggadah and printed 125,000 copies, which were distributed in 220 ShopRite supermarkets in six states.

Lecturer and educator
Horowitz is an educator, lecturer, and spokesperson for kosher food and the American Jewish Historical experience. He has served as the course director of the kosher workshop at Rutgers University and has lectured at numerous national and international events, conferences and symposiums including Wal‐Mart's corporate headquarters, George Washington University's Foodways Symposium at the Smithsonian in Washington, D.C. and Portland State University

Personal life
Horowitz was married to Chansie Weinberger in 1980. She is the daughter of Rabbi Alter Yitzchak Weinberger. Weinberger was a descendant of distinguished rabbinic families, and a prominent communal leader in Turka, Ukraine and assisted many refugees during World War II. They have eight children.

References

 

 
David Grubin Production Studio
Encyclopaedia Judaica

External links
 Bostoner Beis Medrash of Lawrence
 American Jewish Legacy

20th-century American rabbis
21st-century American rabbis
American Hasidic rabbis
Living people
1956 births